Angico is a municipality located in the Brazilian state of Tocantins. Its population was 3,454 (2020) and its area is 452 km2.

References

Municipalities in Tocantins